The E5 is a mobile Wi-Fi device produced by Huawei Technologies, and is part of the company's mobile Wi-Fi series that includes the E5830s, E585, E583c and E586. The E5 series connect to other devices using a wireless interface. The devices are pocket size and allow users to access the Internet through any Wi-Fi device, mobile phone, game console, digital camera, notebook and personal digital assistant (PDA).

Products

E5
Huawei launched the E5 at the Mobile World Congress in Barcelona in February 2009. It was originally named the E583X and is also known as the E5830/E5852. The E5 offers high-speed wireless connectivity, providing users with group internet access, individual Wi-Fi hotspots and connection to devices such as notebooks, digital cameras and games consoles. It also allows users to play games online and transfer pictures.

The E5 is 95mm × 48mm × 13mm, 90g in weight and is equipped with a microSD card with storage capacity of up to 32GB. It can support networks such as GSM, EDGE, GPRS, UMTS and HSPA and comes with five LED indicators. The E5 has download speeds of 7.2 Mbit/s and uplink speeds of 5.76Mbit/s.

E5830s
The E5830s mobile Wi-Fi device connects to devices using its wireless interface, providing Internet access through any Wi-Fi device, mobile phone, game console, digital camera, notebook and PDA. Key features include: intelligent power control, temperature protection, web messages, web SD card information sharing, small screen page setting and screen display of statuses.

E585
Huawei developed the E585 based on feedback from consumers and UK wireless carrier 3, including a start-up button and OLED display detailing information such as signal strength, 3G or HSDPA connectivity, number of devices connected to the hub, battery level, and the network being used. It is equipped with a personal mobile Wi-Fi hotspot for a maximum of five compatible devices including notebooks, iPads, or handheld gaming consoles simultaneously. The E585 is compatible with Windows, Mac and Linux.

E583c
Huawei announced the launch of its next-generation mobile Wi-Fi device, the E583C in July 2010. The device was based on the original E5, but the company stated that it had made further improvements to the E583c's performance and stability. The E583c converts 3.5G HSPA mobile signal into Wi-Fi coverage, automatically creating Internet access and individual Wi-Fi hotspots for up to five Wi-Fi-enabled digital devices. It can also provide simultaneous Internet access to a sixth device when it is connected to a laptop computer via a USB cable. The E583c weighs 90 grams and features a 1-inch color OLED display that shows information such as network operator details, signal strength, Wi-Fi connection status, and battery level. It enables wireless data transmission or online gaming on a range of Wi-Fi-enabled digital devices, including iPads, iPod Touch, netbooks, laptop computers, portable multimedia centers, game consoles, PDAs, mobile phones and digital cameras.

The E583c is compatible with Windows, Mac or Linux and has data transmission speeds of up to 5.76Mbit/s (uplink) and 7.2Mbit/s (download). It also has a built-in microSD memory card slot (maximum 32GB) that can be used as a USB memory stick.  Linux requires a driver that is not shipped with the unit.

E586
On 17 August 2011, UK 3 announced its new high-speed mobile Wi-Fi device: the Huawei-built E586 MiFi, the first mobile Wi-Fi device in the UK to feature next generation HSPA+ mobile broadband technology. Compared with the E585, the E586 provides users with approximately 40% faster download and uplink, offering 21.1 Mbit/s download (HSDPA) and 5.76 Mbit/s uplink (HSUPA). Similarly to previous models, the E586's features include Wi-Fi for iPads, laptops or handheld games consoles. The E586 also features an OLED screen displaying information such as the amount of data used, speed of the current connection and length of browsing time, as well as a newly designed dashboard for viewing text messages and changing settings. A new feature of the E586 allows users to see their Wi-Fi user name and password on screen for pairing with new gadgets. The device has an internal memory slot for microSD card that supports up to 32GB and approximately 4.5 hours battery life.

E587
The Huawei E587 was presented at the Mobile World Congress in 2011. Compared to the earlier products Huawei doubles (50%) the download and upload speed.  Customers getting up to 42.2 Mbit/s throughout the DC-HSPA+ technology. The upload speed provides 11 Mbit/s (HSUPA). Beside WiFi IEEE 802.11 b/g the Huawei E587 also supports IEEE 802.11n. The OLED-Display expose signal strength with technology, current operator, battery lifetime, amount of the current WiFi users, incoming messages and internet connection status. The mobile Hotspot has an internal memory slot for microSD card that supports up to 32GB and approximately 5 hours battery life (2200 mAh). Additionally the device has an external antenna connector (TS-9).

E589
On 13 January 2012, Huawei unveils the world's first multi-mode WiFi device, the Huawei E589, at the CES. In comparison with the predecessor the Huawei E589 supports LTE category 3 (100 Mbit/s downlink and 50 Mbit/s uplink) and provides internet connection up to 10 devices. Connected to 3G the MiFi reaches download speed up to 42.2 MBit/s. The E589 also features a TFT screen displaying information such as the amount of data used, speed of the current connection and length of browsing time. The mobile Hotspot has an internal memory slot for microSD card that supports up to 32GB and approximately 6 hours battery life (3000 mAh). Additionally the device has an external antenna connector (TS-9). Vodafone offers a branded version, the R210, which is nearly similar to the original device.

E5786 
On 23 February 2014, Huawei introduced the world's first category 6 (up to 300 Mbit/s downlink) LTE mobile Hotspot at Mobile World Congress. Huawei uses a HiSilicon LTE Cat6 chipset that runs on a 28 nm HPM Cortex-A9 processor. Beside faster download speed the Huawei E5786 offers support for dual band (2.4/5 GHz) Wi-Fi ac including easy access by connecting with simply scanning a QR code.

Specifications

Huawei E5830, E5830s, E583c and E585

Huawei E586, E587 and E589

Huawei E5151, E5220 and E5221

Huawei E5330, E5331, E5332 and E5336

Huawei E5372, E5373 and E5377/E5377T/EC5377

Huawei E5573

Huawei E5730, E5756, E5775 and E5776

Huawei E5786

Huawei Mobile Wi-Fi E5878

Reception and awards
By December 2009, shipments of the E5 wireless modem exceeded 300,000 units and orders had been placed by 40 network operators worldwide. Huawei's 2010 annual report stated that more than three million units of E5 had been sold around the world, . According to market research agency GfK Group, the E5 ranked number one in Japan for sales of wireless network cards with nearly 30% of market share.

The E5 series have received awards including: "Best iPad Accessory 2010" at the Macworld Awards 2010 and "Work Gadget of the Year" at the T3 Gadget Awards 2010, both for the Huawei E5.

References

External links
 Huawei mobile Wi-Fi devices
 The Top 5 4G LTE Mobile Routers Review 2015

Information appliances
Huawei products
Wi-Fi
Mobile hotspots